Kanto Boy 2: Anak ni Totoy Guapo is a 1994 Philippine action film directed by Augusto Salvador. The film stars Ian Veneracion as the title role. It was one of the entries in the 1994 Metro Manila Film Festival.

Cast
Ian Veneracion as Guiller
Kimberly Diaz as Michelle
Ramon Christopher as Albert
Dick Israel as Benjie
Bunny Paras as Bernadette
Bob Soler as Totoy Guwapo
Max Laurel as Igay
Dencio Padilla as Maning
Jaime Fabregas as Don Anselmo
Debraliz as Marvi
Eric Francisco as Arman
Dindo Arroyo as Albert's Aide
Mike Magat as Albert's Aide
Devin Villarama as Albert's Aide

Awards

Notes

References

External links

1994 films
1994 action films
Filipino-language films
Philippine action films
Moviestars Production films
Films directed by Augusto Salvador